"This Feeling" is a song by The Chainsmokers featuring Kelsea Ballerini. Written by the Chainsmokers and Emily Warren, with production handled by former, it was released by Disruptor Records and Columbia Records on September 18, 2018, as the seventh single from the Chainsmokers' second studio album, Sick Boy. It is also featured on the deluxe edition of Ballerini's second studio album, Unapologetically.

Live performances
Kelsea Ballerini and The Chainsmokers debuted the song on The Ellen DeGeneres Show. They also performed the song on November 19, on the ESPN Monday Night Football Genesis Halftime Show between the Los Angeles Rams and the Kansas City Chiefs at the Los Angeles Memorial Coliseum. They also performed the song at Victoria's Secret Fashion Show 2018.

Music video 
A music video for "This Feeling" was released on November 12, 2018. The video features both the Chainsmokers and Ballerini participating in a motocross race while facing inner conflicts. The video ends with a mysterious shot of "multiple bikes laid out in what appears to be a crash with sirens blaring in the background".

Commercial performance
The song has sold 145,000 copies in the United States as of March 2019.  It has been certified double Platinum by the RIAA for over 2 million units in combined sales and streams.

Charts

Weekly charts

Year-end charts

Certifications

References

2018 songs
2018 singles
The Chainsmokers songs
Kelsea Ballerini songs
Columbia Records singles
Vocal collaborations
Songs written by Andrew Taggart
Songs written by Emily Warren
Songs written by Alex Pall